The following are the Pulitzer Prizes for 1925.

Journalism awards
Reporting:
James W. Mulroy and Alvin H. Goldstein of the Chicago Daily News, for their service toward the solution of the murder of Robert Franks, Jr., in Chicago on May 22, 1924, and the bringing to justice of Nathan F. Leopold and Richard Loeb.
Editorial Writing:
Charleston News and Courier, for the editorial entitled "The Plight of the South". (No author named)

Editorial Cartooning:
Rollin Kirby of the New York World for "News from the Outside World."

Letters and Drama Awards
Novel:
So Big by Edna Ferber (Doubleday)
Drama:
They Knew What They Wanted by Sidney Howard (Doubleday)
History:
History of the American Frontier by Frederic L. Paxson (Houghton)
Biography or Autobiography:
Barrett Wendell and His Letters by M. A. Dewolfe Howe (Little)
Poetry:
The Man Who Died Twice by Edwin Arlington Robinson (Macmillan)

External links
Pulitzer Prizes for 1925

Pulitzer Prizes by year
Pulitzer Prize
Pulitzer Prize